Opio is a commune in the Alpes-Maritimes department in southeastern France situated near Grasse.

Population

Personalities
Coluche died in Opio at the age of 41, when his motorcycle crashed into a lorry.

Serbian triple agent Duško Popov died in Opio on 10 August 1981, aged 69.

See also
Communes of the Alpes-Maritimes department

References

Communes of Alpes-Maritimes
Alpes-Maritimes communes articles needing translation from French Wikipedia